Velika is a village and a municipality in the Požega Valley in Slavonia.

Geography
It is located on the southern slopes of Papuk Mountain 12 km north of Požega, in the Požega-Slavonia County, with the elevation of 278 m.

Velika is located on the Požega - Slatina county road and Velika - Požega - Pleternica railway.

Economy
Chief occupations include farming, viticulture and tourism (recreational centre).

Demographics
There are a total of 5,607 people in the municipality, in the following settlements:
 Antunovac, population 158
 Biškupci, population 354
 Bratuljevci, population 25
 Doljanci, population 84
 Draga, population 275
 Gornji Vrhovci, population 10
 Kantrovci, population 34
 Klisa, population 0
 Lučinci, population 53
 Markovac, population 1
 Milanovac, population 45
 Milivojevci, population 17
 Nježić, population 1
 Oljasi, population 63
 Ozdakovci, population 5
 Poljanska, population 96
 Potočani, population 182
 Radovanci, population 483
 Smoljanovci, population 3
 Stražeman, population 231
 Toranj, population 173
 Trenkovo, population 799
 Trnovac, population 398
 Velika, population 2,117

94% of the population are Croats. There are only 3 Serbian households and few people of Czech, Hungarian, German and Slovenian descent.

History
It was ruled by Ottoman Empire between 1532 and 1687 and again between 1690 and 1691 as part of Sanjak of Pojega before Austrian conquest.fy

References

Populated places in Požega-Slavonia County
Slavonia
Velika
Municipalities of Croatia